The 380th Air Refueling Squadron is an inactive United States Air Force unit. It was last assigned to the 380th Bombardment Wing at Plattsburgh Air Force Base, New York where it was inactivated on 30 September 1995.

The squadron was first active during World War II as the 580th Bombardment Squadron, which served as an Operational Training Unit and Replacement Training Unit during World War II.

The 380th Air Refueling Squadron was activated at Lincoln Air Force Base, Nebraska in November 1954.  In 1956 it moved to Plattsburgh where it served with Boeing KC-97 Stratofreighter and Boeing KC-135 Stratotanker aircraft until inactivating.  In September 1985, the two squadrons were consolidated into a single unit.

History

World War II
The earliest predecessor of the squadron was the 580th Bombardment Squadron, which was activated at Geiger Field, Washington, in February early 1943 as one of the original squadrons of the 393rd Bombardment Group.   In March, the squadron moved to Gowen Field, Idaho and began to equip with Boeing B-17 Flying Fortresses to act as an Operational Training Unit (OTU).  The OTU program involved the use of an oversized parent unit to provide cadres  to "satellite groups".  The OTU program was patterned after the unit training system of the Royal Air Force.  It assumed responsibility for unit training and oversaw their expansion with graduates of Army Air Forces Training Command schools to become effective combat units.  Phase I training concentrated on individual training in crewmember specialties.  Phase II training emphasized the coordination for the crew to act as a team. The final phase concentrated on operation as a unit.  The squadron was at Gowen for a month before moving to Wendover Field, Utah.

The 393rd Group moved to Sioux City Army Air Base, Iowa in June 1943, but only the 582nd Squadron remained there with group headquarters.  On 4 July, the 580th relocated to Watertown Army Air Field, South Dakota.

On 1 August 1943, the group moved to Kearney Army Air Field, Nebraska, where it was joined by the 580th Squadrons, which changed its mission to a Replacement Training Unit (RTU).  By 1943 most combat units had been activated and almost three quarters of them had deployed overseas.  With the exception of special programs, like forming Boeing B-29 Superfortress units, training "fillers" for existing units became more important than unit training. RTUs were oversized units like OTUs, but their mission was to train individual pilots or aircrews.

In November 1943, the group returned to Sioux City.  However, The Army Air Forces (AAF) was finding that standard military units like the 580th, whose manning was based on relatively inflexible tables of organization were proving not well adapted to the training mission, even more so to the replacement mission.  Accordingly, the AAF adopted a more functional system in which each base was organized into a separate numbered unit.  As a result, the 580th, along with the other components of the 393rd Group, were inactivated and their personnel and equipment were combined with those of support units at Sioux City into the 224th AAF Base Unit (Combat Crew Training Station, Bombardment, Heavy), which assumed the base's training mission.

Strategic Air Command refueling operations

The 380th Air Refueling Squadron was first activated in the summer of 1954 at Lincoln Air Force Base, Nebraska.  It moved to Plattsburgh Air Force Base, New York in 1956 with Boeing KC-97 Stratofreighters providing air refueling to SAC B-47s and other USAF aircraft as directed.  It converted to jet-powered Boeing KC-135 Stratotankers in 1964.  In 1985 the two squadrons were consolidated. The squadron deployed aircraft and personnel to forward SAC provisional units in Western Pacific during the Vietnam War.  

During the summer of 1988, aircrew from both the 380 AREFS and 310 AREFS of the 380th Bomb Wing deployed for the first time since World War II to Hunter Army Airfield, GA. For this deployment over 300 men and women deployed to their forward operating base in support of "Mighty Warrior 1988", a SAC wide exercise held to prepare and demonstrate the various SAC wings ability to carry out their respective missions under austere conditions. 

The unit deployed aircraft and personnel to 1703d Air Refueling Wing, Provisional at King Khalid International Airport, Riyadh, Saudi Arabia between September 1990 and March 1991 during Operation Desert Shield and Operation Desert Storm.   The squadron remained on duty until shutdown of Plattsburgh and inactivation of parent 380th Bombardment Wing in 1994.

Lineage

 580th Bombardment Squadron
 Constituted as the 580th Bombardment Squadron (Light) on 29 January 1943
 Activated on 16 February 1943
 Inactivated on 1 April 1944
 Consolidated with the 380th Air Refueling Squadron as the 380th Air Refueling Squadron on 19 September 1985

 380th Air Refueling Squadron
 Constituted on 5 May 1954 as the 380th Air Refueling Squadron, Medium
 Activated on 8 July 1954
 Redesignated 380th Air Refueling Squadron, Heavy on 1 July 1964
 Consolidated with the 580th Bombardment Squadron on 19 September 1985
 Redesignated 380th Air Refueling Squadron on 1 September 1991
 Inactivated on 1 October 1994

Assignments
 393d Bombardment Group: 16 February 1943 – 1 April 1944
 Fifteenth Air Force: 8 July 1964 (attached to 98th Air Base Group)
 98th Bombardment Wing: 1 August 1954
 Eighth Air Force: 8 November 1954 (attached to 96th Bombardment Wing)
 Second Air Force: 1 April 1955
 380th Bombardment Wing: 16 August 1956
 4108th Air Refueling Wing: 1 April 1961
 497th Air Refueling Wing, 1 January 1963
 380th Bombardment Wing: 15 September 1964
 380th Operations Group: 1 September 1991 – 1 October 1994

Stations
 Geiger Field, Washington, 26 January 1943
 Gowen Field, Idaho, 3 March 1943
 Wendover Field, Utah, 3 April 1943
 Sioux City Army Air Base. 9 June 1943
 Watertown Army Air Field, South Dakota, 4 July 1943
 Kearney Army Air Field, Nebraska, 1 August 1943
 Sioux City Army Air Base, Iowa, c. 5 November 1943 – 1 April 1944
 Lincoln Air Force Base, Nebraska, 8 November 1954
 Sheppard Air Force Base, Texas, 8 November 1954
 Plattsburgh Air Force Base, New York, 16 August 1956 – 1 October 1994

Aircraft
 Boeing B-17 Flying Fortress, 1943–1944
 Boeing KC-97 Stratofreighter, 1956–1964
 Boeing KC-135 Stratotanker, 1964–1995

Commanders
 Lt Col John Gentry, 1986-1988
 Lt Col Paul Gutman, 1989-1990
 Lt Col Ken Mills, 1990-1992

Awards and campaigns

References

Notes

Bibliography

 
 
 
 
 
 
 

Air refueling squadrons of the United States Air Force
Military units and formations established in 1954
Units and formations of Strategic Air Command